Goondiwindi State High School is located in Goondiwindi, Queensland, Australia. It educates students, years 8 to 12, from the local area: Goondiwindi, Yelarbon, Inglewood, Millmerran, Toobeah as well as many other small towns in the district.

History 
Goondiwindi State High School opened on 28 January 1964. Enrolments in February that year totaled 178 students.

In 2014, the student enrolment was 477 students with 41 teachers (38 full-time equivalent).

See also
Goondiwindi Region

References

External links
 Goondiwindi State High School

Educational institutions established in 1964
Public high schools in Queensland
Schools on the Darling Downs
1964 establishments in Australia
Goondiwindi